Gilze en Rijen is a municipality in the southern Netherlands. The municipality contains four villages: Rijen, Gilze, Hulten and Molenschot. It is home to the Gilze-Rijen Air Base.

Rijen grew in the 19th century due to its leather factories.

Population centres

Topography

Dutch Topographic map of the municipality of Gilze en Rijen, June 2015

Transportation
Railway Station: Gilze-Rijen

Climate
The climate in this area has mild differences between highs and lows, and there is adequate rainfall year-round.  According to the Köppen Climate Classification system, Gilze en Rijen has a marine west coast climate, abbreviated "Cfb" on climate maps.

However, a day later, on 25 July, temperatures in Gilze en Rijen reached , making it the first place ever in The Netherlands where  was measured and took away the record back from Eindhoven. Climate change was found to be the culprit of such hot temperatures in Netherlands.

Notable people 

 Marcellin Theeuwes (1936 in Gilze en Rijen – 2019) was a Dutch Carthusian monk
 Jacques Theeuwes (born 1944 in Rijen) a Dutch economist, accountant and academic
 Henriette van Lynden-Leijten (1950 in Gilze en Rijen – 2010) a Dutch Baroness and diplomat to Bulgaria and the Vatican

Sport 
 Janus Theeuwes (1886 in Gilze en Rijen – 1975) an archer, gold medallist in the 1920 Summer Olympics
 Joep van den Ouweland (born 1984 in Gilze en Rijen) is a Dutch footballer with over 300 club caps
 Cees Doorakkers (born 1963 in Gilze) a former Grand Prix motorcycle road racer
 Jeroen Blijlevens (born 1971 in Gilze en Rijen) a retired road bicycle racer

See also
Heikant, Rijen

Gallery

References

External links

Official website

 
Municipalities of North Brabant